The Old Barracks is a former military installation in Barrack Road, Warwick, England. It is a Grade I listed building.

History
The building was designed by Thomas Johnson in the Greek Doric style as the local prison and completed in 1783. It was extended and modified by Henry Couchman in 1793. After the prison moved to Cape Road in 1860, the building was converted into barracks for the 1st Warwickshire Militia Regiment in 1860. Immediately prior to the First World War, the divisional headquarters of the South Midland Division was located in the building. It was then used as an army record office. It was decommissioned in 1930 and subsequently integrated into the Shire Hall complex when the complex was extended in 1932.

References

Drill halls in England
Buildings and structures in Warwick
Grade I listed buildings in Warwickshire